Zhang Wanqiong (born 21 January 1994) is a Chinese weightlifter.

She participated at the 2018 World Weightlifting Championships, winning a medal.

References

External links
 
 

1994 births
Living people
Chinese female weightlifters
World Weightlifting Championships medalists
Weightlifters at the 2014 Asian Games
Asian Games medalists in weightlifting
Asian Games bronze medalists for China
Medalists at the 2014 Asian Games
21st-century Chinese women